The Suzuki GSR750 is a 749 cc 16-valve in-line four motorcycle that was introduced in 2011 as a  middleweight street-bike built with a 2005 GSX-R750 derived engine, which has been re-tuned for a more usable midrange at the expense of high end power.

ABS was added since 2012, 2015 it has arrived in the USA and at the Intermot 2016 a newly named GSX-S750 was announced.

References

External links
  at Suzuki UK
  /  at Suzuki USA
 Suzuki GSR750 (2011-on) review

GSR750
Standard motorcycles
Motorcycles introduced in 2011